Staniford is an English surname. Notable people with the surname include:

 Frank Staniford (1893–1987), Australian politician
 Michaela Staniford (born 1987), English rugby union player
 Tom Staniford (born 1989), English para-cyclist 

English-language surnames